The Maine congressional elections of 2006 were held on Tuesday, November 7, 2006.  The terms of both representatives to the United States House of Representatives expired on January 3, 2007, and therefore were put up for contest. The winning candidates served a two-year term from January 3, 2007, to January 3, 2009. The primary elections were held on Tuesday, June 13, 2006.

Overview

District 1
Incumbent Democratic Congressman Tom Allen has been in office since 1997.  He defeated Republican challenger Darlene Curley and independent Dexter Kamilewicz in the general election.  Neither Allen nor Curley were challenged in their respective primaries.

District 2
Incumbent Democratic Congressman Michael Michaud  has served in Congress since 2003. Michaud defeated Republican Laurence D'Amboise in the general election.  Neither Michaud nor D'Amboise were challenged in their respective primaries.

References

See also

Maine

2006
2006 Maine elections